Thomas Boles (July 16, 1837 – March 13, 1905) was an American politician, a judge, and a U.S. Representative from Arkansas.

Biography
Born near Clarksville, Arkansas, Boles attended the common schools and taught school for several years.

Career
Boles was a deputy sheriff in Yell County, Arkansas in 1858 and deputy clerk of the circuit court of Yell County in 1859 and 1860.  He studied law and was admitted to the bar in 1860 whereupon he commenced practice in Danville, Arkansas.

During the American Civil War, Boles served on the Union side as captain of Company E, Third Regiment, Arkansas Volunteer Cavalry from 1863 until 1864.  After the war he served as judge of the fourth judicial circuit from 1865 until April 20, 1868, when he resigned.

Upon the readmission of Arkansas to representation Boles was elected as a Republican to the Fortieth Congress and was reelected to the Forty-first Congress, serving from June 22, 1868 until March 3, 1871.  He successfully contested the election of John Edwards to the Forty-second Congress and again served from February 9, 1872 until March 3, 1873,  but he was not a candidate for renomination in 1872.

Boles resumed the practice of law at Dardanelle, Arkansas and also served many years as school director and alderman.  He was appointed receiver of the land office at Dardanelle by President Hayes in February 1878.  He then served as a United States marshal for the western district of Arkansas from 1881 until 1889. He was a delegate to every Republican State convention from the organization of the party until his death. He also served as clerk of the United States Circuit Court for the Eighth Judicial Circuit from September 1897 until his death.

Death
Boles died in Fort Smith, Sebastian County, Arkansas, on March 13, 1905. He is interred at Brearley Cemetery, Dardanelle, Arkansas.

References

External links 

1837 births
1905 deaths
People from Johnson County, Arkansas
Republican Party members of the United States House of Representatives from Arkansas
United States Marshals
People from Clarksville, Arkansas
People from Yell County, Arkansas
People from Dardanelle, Arkansas
19th-century American politicians
People of Arkansas in the American Civil War
Southern Unionists in the American Civil War
Union Army officers
Burials in Arkansas